Boyovut is a district of Sirdaryo Region in Uzbekistan. The capital lies at the town Boyovut. The district consists of 4 urban-type settlements (Boyovut, Markaz, Bekat, Doʻstlik) and 12 rural communities.

References

Districts of Uzbekistan
Sirdaryo Region